Eng or engma (capital: Ŋ, lowercase: ŋ) is a letter of the Latin alphabet, used to represent a voiced velar nasal (as in English sii) in the written form of some languages and in the International Phonetic Alphabet.

In Washo, lower-case  represents a typical  sound, while upper-case  represents a voiceless  sound. This convention comes from Americanist phonetic notation.

History
The First Grammatical Treatise, a 12th-century work on the phonology of the Old Icelandic language, uses a single grapheme for the eng sound, shaped like a g with a stroke .
Alexander Gill the Elder uses an uppercase G with a hooked tail and a lowercase n with the hooked tail of a script g  for the same sound in Logonomia Anglica in 1619.
William Holder uses the letter in Elements of Speech: An Essay of Inquiry into the Natural Production of Letters, published in 1669, but it was not printed as intended; he indicates in his errata that “there was intended a character for Ng, viz., n with a tail like that of g, which must be understood where the Printer has imitated it by n or y”.
It was later used in Benjamin Franklin's phonetic alphabet, with its current phonetic value.

Appearance
Lowercase eng is derived from n, with the addition of a hook to the right leg, somewhat like that of j. Nowadays, the uppercase has two main variants: it can be based on the usual uppercase N, with a hook added (or "N-form"); or it can be an enlarged version of the lowercase (or "n-form"). The former is preferred in Sami languages that use it, the latter in African languages, such as in Shona from 1931 to 1955, and several in west and central Africa currently. In Isaac Pitman’s Phonotypic Alphabet, the uppercase had a reversed-N form.

Early printers, lacking a specific glyph for eng, sometimes approximated it by rotating a capital G, or by substituting a Greek letter η (eta) before modified to present form  for it (encoded in Unicode as the Latin letter n with long leg: Ƞ ƞ).

Pronunciation of words containing eng sound
In most languages eng is absent in the Latin alphabet but its sound can be present in the letter n in words. In English, it is heard in the potential digraphs nc (hard c), ng (hard g), nk, nq and nx, often at the end of words.

In British English, n is pronounced eng in the prefixes en- and in- when they are followed by c, g and q, as in encroachment, engagement, enquiry, incursion, ingredient, inquiry and others. In other English dialects, the n is pronounced  instead. In many British dialects, the ng in strength and length is simply pronounced , with g a silent letter, and the ng is otherwise pronounced  in those words.

Usage

Technical transcription
Americanist phonetic notation, where it may also represent a uvular nasal.
Sometimes for the transcription of Australian Aboriginal languages
International Phonetic Alphabet
Uralic Phonetic Alphabet including 
Teuthonista phonetic transcription system uses 
Rheinische Dokumenta, a phonetic alphabet for many West Central German dialects, Low Rhenish, and few related languages.

Vernacular orthographies

Languages marked † no longer use eng, but formerly did.
African languages
Bari
Bemba
Dagbani
Dinka
Efik
Ewe
Frafra
Fula
Ganda
Manding languages
Nuer
Shona language†
Songhay languages
Wolof
Zarma
American languages
Inupiat
Lakota
O'odham
 Austroasiatic languages
Tonga
Australian Aboriginal languages
Bandjalang
Yolngu
Languages of China
Zhuang† (replaced by the digraph ng in 1986)
Hanyu Pinyin † used ŋ as a short hand form of ng.  
Sami languages
Inari Sami
Lule Sami
Northern Sami
Ume Sami
Skolt Sami
Kildin Sami (during Latinisation in the 1930s)
Turkic languages during Latinisation in the 1930s used Ꞑ ꞑ, sometimes considered a variant of eng.
Kazakh language† (2019 revision of the Latin alphabet; replaced with Ñ in the April 2021 proposal)
Mapuche language (Wirizüŋun script)
Kalam languages
Kalam language

Computer encoding
Eng is encoded in Unicode as U+014A LATIN CAPITAL LETTER ENG and U+014B LATIN SMALL LETTER ENG, part of the Latin Extended-A range. In ISO 8859-4 (Latin-4) it's located at BD (uppercase) and BF (lowercase).

In African languages such as Bemba, ng' (with an apostrophe) is widely used as a substitute in media where eng is hard to reproduce.

See also

Ng (digraph)
Nh (digraph)
 Eta (Greek letter)
 g
Similar Latin letters:
Ƞ ƞ
Ɲ ɲ
N n
M m
Ꞑ ꞑ
Ŋ ŋ
Ɱ ɱ
Ꜧ ꜧ
Similar Cyrillic letters:
Ӈ ӈ
Ң ң
Ҥ ҥ

References

External links
Practical Orthography of African Languages
FileFormat.info – Fonts that support LATIN CAPITAL LETTER ENG (U+014A) and LATIN SMALL LETTER ENG (U+014B)

Latin letters with diacritics
Phonetic transcription symbols
Latin-script letters